Selaginella biformis is a species of plant in the family Selaginellaceae. It is native to Bangladesh, Borneo, Cambodia, China, Eastern Himalaya, India, Java, Laos, the Lesser Sunda Islands, Myanmar, New Guinea, the Nicobar Islands, the Philippines, the Ryukyu Islands, Sulawesi, Sumatra, Thailand, and Vietnam.

References

Sources
gourav gowda c r n, (2008). Taxonomy of Selaginella: a study of characters, techniques, and classification in the Hong Kong species. Botanical Journal of the Linnean Society, Volume 98 Issue 4, Pages 277 - 302.

biformis
Taxa named by Alexander Braun
Taxa named by Friedrich Adalbert Maximilian Kuhn
Flora of Bangladesh
Flora of China
Flora of East Himalaya
Flora of India (region)
Flora of Indo-China
Flora of Malesia
Flora of New Guinea
Flora of the Ryukyu Islands